Edward Threlkeld  (1526–1588) was Archdeacon of Carlisle from 1568 until his death.

Threlkeld was  born at Burgh by Sands and educated at Peterhouse, Cambridge. He held livings at  Great Salkeld, South Cheriton, Tenbury and Much Marcle.

References

Archdeacons of Carlisle
Alumni of Peterhouse, Cambridge
15th-century English people
1588 deaths
People from Burgh by Sands
1526 births